This is a list of countries by size of the labour force  mostly based on The World Factbook.

Notes

Lists of countries by economic indicator
Demographic lists
Workforce